Ventana Medical Systems, Inc. was a medical device company that develops, manufactures, and markets instrument reagent systems that automate tissue and slide staining in anatomic pathology laboratories. These products assist in the diagnosis and treatment of cancer and infectious diseases.

The company is now part of the Roche Diagnostics Division and has been renamed Roche Tissues Diagnostics.

Company history
Pathologist and University of Arizona professor Thomas Grogan, M.D., founded Ventana in 1985. The company launched its first instrument reagent system in 1991, and held an initial public offering (IPO) in 1996, trading under the symbol VMSI on the NASDAQ stock exchange.

In 2007, Ventana acquired Spring BioScience Corp, a developer and supplier of monoclonal antibodies. That same year, Ventana rejected a hostile takeover bid from Roche Holding AG for $75 a share. In February 2008, Roche acquired Ventana with a cash offer of $89.50 per share ($3.4 billion).

Key people
Thomas Grogan, M.D., Founder, Ventana Medical Systems, Inc.
Jill German, President, Ventana Medical Systems, Inc., Head, Roche Tissue Diagnostics

Products
Ventana manufactures products within eight areas:	
Immunohistochemistry (IHC)
in situ hybridization (ISH)
Hematoxylin and eosin (H&E)
Special stains
Personalized medicine
Digital pathology
Workflow
Image analysis

References 

Companies based in Tucson, Arizona
2008 mergers and acquisitions
Roche